The 1993 season was the second full year of competitive football in the Baltic country as an independent nation. After one loss (vs. Switzerland) and one draw (vs. Malta) in 1992  the Estonia national football team, led by manager Uno Piir, carried on in the 1994 FIFA World Cup qualification. Estonia played a total number of fourteen official matches in 1993. The only win came on July 4 against Lithuania in the Baltic Cup 1993, which was played in the Pärnu Kalevi Stadium.

Finland vs Estonia

Latvia vs Estonia

Slovenia vs Estonia

Italy vs Estonia

Estonia vs Malta

Estonia vs Scotland

Scotland vs Estonia

Estonia vs Latvia

Estonia vs Lithuania

Estonia vs Portugal

Estonia vs Italy

Liechtenstein vs Estonia

Portugal vs Estonia

Switzerland vs Estonia

Notes

References
 RSSSF detailed results
 RSSSF detailed results
 RSSSF detailed results
 RSSSF detailed results

1993
Estonia
National